Tang Eng Iron Works is a steelmaking company in Taiwan. Its headquarters is in Siaogang District of Kaohsiung.

History
It was once the largest steel company in the Japanese-ruled Taiwan. It transformed into a province-owned company in 1962, and reorganized as a state-owned company in 1999. The company has been reprivatized since 2006. At one time, Tang Eng also owned some brick making factories which were abandoned in 1980s, and had been designated as historic monuments of Taiwan.

See also
 List of companies of Taiwan

References

External links
Tang Eng Iron Works

Steel companies of Taiwan
Manufacturing companies established in 1940
1940 establishments in Taiwan
Companies listed on the Taipei Exchange
Manufacturing companies based in Kaohsiung